Hallingdalselva is a river which flows through the valley and traditional district of  Hallingdal in Buskerud County, Norway. Within the valley, the river is often referred to as the Great River (Storåne).

Hallingdal River rises from within the Hardangervidda  mountain plateau. Hallingdal River is  formed by the confluence of the Usta River which flows from Lake Ustevatn and the Holselva River from  Lake Strandavatnet.  Hallingdal River flows from the north into Lake Krøderen  (Krøderfjorden) at Gulsvik.  Lake Krøderen discharges via the Snarumselva (Snamum river) at the south end of the lake.

A number of rivers flow into the Hallingdal River including the  Votna, Lya, Hemsil, Todøla and Rukkedøla. There are many hydro-electric power stations in the valley with an annual power production of about 4 TWh. The whole river system is now almost fully developed with a total of 13 power plants. The largest plants are Hol I-III (275 MW), Nes (250 MW), Usta (184 MW) and Hemsil I-II (152 MW). The total average annual production is approximately 4143 GWh. Most of the waterfall rights are owned by E-CO Energi.

References

External links
Fishing in the Hallingdal River

Rivers of Viken
Rivers of Norway